My Fair Lady Loves Jazz is an album by American jazz pianist Billy Taylor featuring performances of show tunes from the musical My Fair Lady recorded in 1957 and originally released on the ABC-Paramount label and rereleased Impulse! label in 1964 following the release of the film.

Reception
The Allmusic review by Scott Yanow awarded the album 4½ stars calling it "one of the very best jazz interpretations of the classic score... Highly recommended".

Track listing
All compositions by Alan Jay Lerner and Frederick Loewe
 "Show Me" - 4:46 
 "I've Grown Accustomed to Her Face" - 3:42 
 "With a Little Bit of Luck" - 4:31 
 "The Rain in Spain" - 3:02 
 "Get Me to the Church on Time" - 4:15 
 "Wouldn't It Be Loverly?" - 5:01 
 "I Could Have Danced All Night" - 4:00 
 "On the Street Where You Live" - 3:40 
Recorded in New York City on Jersey on January 8 (track 2), January 22 (tracks 3, 6 & 8) and February 5 (tracks 1, 4, 5 & 7), 1957

Personnel
Billy Taylor – piano
Ernie Royal - trumpet
Don Elliott - trumpet, mellophone, vibes, bongos
Jimmy Cleveland - trombone
Jim Buffington - French horn
Don Butterfield (tracks 1, 2, 4, 5 & 7), Jay McAllister (tracks 3, 6 7 8) - tuba
Anthony Ortega - alto saxophone, tenor saxophone
Charlie Fowlkes - baritone saxophone, bass clarinet (tracks 2, 3, 6 & 8)
Al Casamenti - guitar
Earl May – bass
Ed Thigpen – drums
Quincy Jones - arranger, conductor

References

Impulse! Records albums
ABC Records albums
Albums arranged by Quincy Jones
Billy Taylor albums
1957 albums
Albums conducted by Quincy Jones